St. Ann with Emmanuel Church, Nottingham is a parish church in the Church of England in St Ann's, Nottingham.

History

St. Ann with Emmanuel was opened in 1974. It replaced two previous churches of St. Ann's Church, Nottingham (by Robert Clarke, demolished 1971) and Emmanuel Church, Woodborough Road (by Watson Fothergill demolished 1972).

Sources
The Buildings of England, Nottinghamshire Nikolaus Pevsner

External links
See St. Ann with Emmanuel Church on Google Street View

Nottingham St Ann
Churches completed in 1974
20th-century Church of England church buildings
Nottingham St Ann